Mr. Bass's Planetoid is a 1958 children's science fiction novel by Canadian author Eleanor Cameron. The novel follows The Wonderful Flight to the Mushroom Planet (1954) and Stowaway to the Mushroom Planet (1956). The book is illustrated by Louis Darling.

Plot introduction
The boys hunt for Prewytt Brumblydge, inventor of the Brumblitron, which is threatening to explode, destroying the Earth. This time, instead of journeying to Basidium, they fly to an airless rock named Lepton that orbits 1,000 miles above the Earth's surface. This novel introduces the fictional metal Brumblium, a greenish metal that shows as infragreen on a spectroscope and has twice the density of uranium.

See also

A Mystery for Mr. Bass, the sequel volume to this story
 "Men of Harlech", a Welsh song

1958 Canadian novels
1958 science fiction novels
Canadian science fiction novels
Children's science fiction novels
Space exploration novels
Novels by Eleanor Cameron
Works set on fictional moons
Little, Brown and Company books
1958 children's books